Melody Street is an early American television series, hosted by Elliot Lawrence, which aired on the DuMont Television Network. The program aired Fridays at 8:30pm ET from September 25, 1953, to February 5, 1954. Each episode was 30 minutes long. One guest star was guitarist Tony Mottola.

Criticism
Melody Street was hampered by a small budget, even by 1950s standards. Later-day critics, such as Castleman and Podrazik (1982), have cited Melody Street, among other DuMont series, as one of the reasons fewer and fewer viewers tuned in to the ailing DuMont Network. They stated Melody Street was, like several other DuMont programs during the 1953–1954 season, "doomed from the start by third-rate scripts and cheap production" and pointed out that the program "required the performers to lip-sync other people's records."

Reception
John Lester for the Long Island Star-Journal said the program "presents an attractive melange of musical numbers" and that the program had "initiative, ingenuity and imagination".

Episode status
Two complete episodes, January 1, 1954, and another 1954 episode, of the show survive at the UCLA Film and Television Archive, along with an excerpt from another episode.

See also
List of programs broadcast by the DuMont Television Network
List of surviving DuMont Television Network broadcasts
1953-54 United States network television schedule

References

Bibliography
David Weinstein, The Forgotten Network: DuMont and the Birth of American Television (Philadelphia: Temple University Press, 2004) 
Alex McNeil, Total Television, Fourth edition (New York: Penguin Books, 1980) 
Tim Brooks and Earle Marsh, The Complete Directory to Prime Time Network TV Shows, Third edition (New York: Ballantine Books, 1964)

External links
Melody Street at IMDB
DuMont historical website

DuMont Television Network original programming
Black-and-white American television shows
1953 American television series debuts
1954 American television series endings
English-language television shows